Sexuality in transgender individuals encompasses all the issues of sexuality of other groups, including establishing a sexual identity, learning to deal with one's sexual needs, and finding a partner, but may be complicated by issues of gender dysphoria, side effects of surgery, physiological and emotional effects of hormone replacement therapy, psychological aspects of expressing sexuality after medical transition, or social aspects of expressing their gender.

Sexual orientation
Historically, clinicians labelled trans people as heterosexual or homosexual relative to their sex assigned at birth. Within the transgender community, sexual orientation terms based on gender identity are the most common, and these terms include lesbian, gay, bisexual, asexual, queer, and others.

Sexual orientation distribution
In the United States, transgender respondents to one 2015 survey self-identified as queer (21%), pansexual (18%), gay, lesbian, or same-gender-loving (16%), straight (15%), bisexual (14%), and asexual (10%). A second study found 23% reported being gay, lesbian, or same-gender-loving, 25% bisexual, 4% asexual, 23% queer, 23% straight and 2% something else.

Transgender women
A 2015 survey of roughly 3,000 American trans women showed that at least 60% were attracted to women. Of the trans women respondents 27% answered gay, lesbian, or same-gender-loving, 20% answered bisexual, 19% heterosexual, 16% pansexual, 6% answered asexual, 6% queer, and 6% did not answer.

Transgender men
Foerster reported a 15-year successful relationship between a woman and a trans man who transitioned in the late 1960s.

In the 20th century, trans men attracted to women struggled to demonstrate the existence and legitimacy of their identity. Many trans men attracted to women, such as jazz musician Billy Tipton, kept their trans status private until their deaths.

Although the literature indicates that most trans men identify as heterosexual, their attraction can vary. 
Author Henry Rubin wrote that "[i]t took the substantial efforts of Lou Sullivan, a gay FTM activist who insisted that female-to-male transgender people could be attracted to men." Matt Kailey, author of Just Add Hormones: An Insider's Guide to the Transsexual Experience, recounts his transition "from 40-something straight woman to the gay man he'd always known himself to be." Researchers eventually acknowledged the existence of this phenomenon, and by the end of the 20th century, psychiatrist Ira Pauly wrote, "The statement that all female-to-male transgender are homosexual [Pauly means attracted to women] in their sexual preference can no longer be made."

A 2015 survey of roughly 2000 American trans men showed more variation in sexual orientation or sexual identity among trans men. 23% identified as heterosexual or straight. The vast majority (65%) identified their sexual orientation or sexual identity as queer (24%), pansexual (17%), bisexual (12%), gay/same-gender loving (12%), asexual (7%), and 5% did not answer.

Trans gay men have varying levels of acceptance within other communities.

Trans-feminine third genders

Psychiatrist Richard Green, in an appendix to Harry Benjamin's 1966 The Transsexual Phenomenon, considers people who were assigned male at birth who have adopted a more feminine gender role.  In this broad overview, entitled "Transsexualism: Mythological, Historical, and Cross-Cultural Aspects", Green argues that the members of these groups are mentally indistinguishable from modern western transsexual women. They have in common  early effeminacy, adulthood femininity, and attraction to masculine males.

The Hijra of the Indian Subcontinent are people who were assigned male at birth but occupy a female sexual and/or gender role, sometimes undergoing castration. As adults, they occupy a female role, but traditionally Hijra describe themselves as neither male nor female, preferring Hijra as their gender.  They often express their femininity in youth; as adults, they are usually sexually-oriented towards masculine men.

Mukhannathun were transgender individuals of the Muslim faith and Arab extraction who were present in Medina and Mecca during and after the time of Muhammad. Ibn Abd Al-Barh Al-Tabaeen, a companion of Aisha Umm ul-Mu'min'in who knew the same mukhannath as Mohammed, stated that "If he is like this, he would have no desire for women and he would not notice anything about them. This is one of those who have no interest in women who were permitted to enter upon women." That said, one of the Mukhannath of Medina during Muhammad's time had married a woman.

Cultural status

Beyond western cultures, sexual behavior and gender roles vary, which affects the place of gender variant people in that culture. Nadleehe of the North American Navajo hold a respected ceremonial position, whereas the Kathoey of Thailand experience more stigma comparatively.

In Iran, while sex change is somewhat accepted, the society is heteronormative. As homosexuality is punishable by death, it is more common to see a trans man being in a relationship with a woman and a trans woman in a relationship with a man.

Sexual practices

Mira Bellwether's self-published 2010 'zine Fucking Trans Women was a landmark work in its focus on the perspectives and experiences of trans women, and has been described in Sexuality & Culture as "a comprehensive guide to trans women's sexuality". It focuses in particular on sex acts possible with flaccid penises and on the innervation of pre-op and non-op trans women's genital areas. It both named and popularized the act of muffing, or stimulating the inguinal canals through an invaginated scrotum, which can offer those with genital dysphoria a way to be penetrated from the front.

Cultural studies scholar J.R. Latham wrote the first definitive analysis of trans men's sexual practices in the journal Sexualities.

Few documentaries have been produced exploring transgender people's sexual practices.
Since 2013, creator Tobi Hill-Meyer has been working on a series of projects related to transgender peoples sexualities titled Doing it Again. 

Research in areas of sexual behavior and experience is ongoing. One study from 2020 conducted in Spain analyzed the sexual health and behaviors of 260 participants.

Naming the body 
Many transgender individuals choose to not use the language that is typically used to refer to sexual body parts, instead using less gendered words. The reason for this practice, is that hearing the typical names for genitalia and other sexual body parts can cause severe gender dysphoria for some trans people.

Not all transgender people choose to rename their bodies. Those that choose not to rename their body, are often less uncomfortable with their body and/or don't associate their sexual body parts with a gender that differs from the one that they identify with. Ultimately, the decision of what language a trans person chooses to use for their body, and wants others to use, is up to the individual whose body is being named.

Transgender women 
Some trans women choose to refer to their anuses as a vagina, pussy, or cunt. (Cunt may also refer to either inguinal canal.) Terms used for the penis include junk, strapoff, strapless, clit, and hen.

Transgender men 
Some trans men refer to their vaginas as their front holes because they find that term less gendered; some use terms like man cave, bonus hole, or boy cunt. Terms used for the clitoris include the dick, cock, dicklet, while the breasts may be called the chesticles.

Effects of transitioning

Effects of feminizing hormone therapy 
For transgender women, taking estrogen stimulates the development of breast tissue, causing them to increase in both size and sensitivity. This increased sensitivity can be pleasurable, painful, or both, depending on the person and the type of stimulation. Furthermore, for those taking estrogen and who have male genitalia, estrogen can (and often does) shrink the external male genitalia and decrease the production of semen (at times bringing the sperm count to zero), and can decrease the ability for the male genitalia to become erect. In addition to these changes, some transgender women going through hormone therapy (HRT) can experience changes in the way their orgasms feel. For example, some people report the ability to experience multiple orgasms.

HRT can cause decrease in sex drive or a change in the way arousal is experienced by trans women. A study published in 2014 found that 62.4% of trans women surveyed reported a decrease in sexual desire after hormone therapy and/or vaginoplasty. A 2008 study reported hypoactive sexual desire disorder (HSDD) in as many as one in three post-operative trans women on HRT, while around a quarter of the cisgender female controls were judged to have the disorder. There was no difference between the two group's reported sexual desire.

Some trans women and healthcare providers anecdotally report the use of progestogens increasing libido.

A 2009 pilot study tested the effectiveness of two treatments for HSDD in trans women: transdermal testosterone and oral dydrogesterone (a progestin). After six weeks of treatment, the group treated with testosterone reported improved sexual desire, while the group treated with the progestin reported no change.

Effects of masculinizing hormone therapy 
For transgender men, one of the most notable physical changes that many taking testosterone experience, in terms of sexuality and the sexual body, is the stimulation of clitoral tissue and the enlargement of the clitoris. This increase in size can range anywhere from just a slight increase to quadrupling in size. Other effects can include vaginal atrophy, where the tissues of the vagina thin and may produce less lubrication. This can make sex with the female genitalia more painful and can, at times, result in bleeding. Transgender men taking testosterone are likely at increased risk of developing urinary tract infections, especially if they have receptive vaginal intercourse.

Other effects that testosterone can have on transgender men can include an increase in their sex drive/libido. At times, this increase can be very sudden and dramatic. Like transgender women, some transgender men also experience changes in the way they experience arousal.

Effects of sex reassignment surgery 
Trans women who have undergone vaginoplasty must dilate in order to properly shape and form the neovagina. After several months, sexual intercourse can replace dilation, but if not sexually active, dilation is required again, for the rest of the patient's life.

Sexual orientation and transitioning

Some trans people maintain a consistent orientation throughout their lives, in some cases remaining with the same partner through transition.

A 2013 study found that 58.2 percent of its 452 transgender and gender-nonconforming respondents experienced sexual attraction changes during their lives, with trans masculine people more likely to experience "sexual fluidity". For transgender people who socially transitioned (about half of the total sample), 64.4 percent experienced attraction changes after transitioning, with trans feminine people more likely to experience sexual fluidity. A 2014 study of 70 trans women and 45 trans men had similar results, with trans women more likely to experience a change in sexual orientation (32.9 percent experienced changes versus 22.2 percent of trans men). In both groups of the 2014 study, trans people initially more attracted to the opposite of the sex they were assigned at birth were significantly more likely to experience sexual orientation changes (i.e. trans men initially attracted to men and trans women initially attracted to women changing their orientations). These sexual orientation changes could occur at any point in the transition process.

Some gynephilic trans women self-report that after transitioning, they became sexually oriented towards males, and explain this as part of their emerging female identity. Kurt Freund hypothesized that such reports might reflect the desire of some trans women to portray themselves as "typically feminine" or, alternatively, might reflect their erotic interest in the validation provided by male partners, rather than representing a genuine change in preference. A 2005 study which relied upon vaginal photoplethysmographies to measure blood-flow in the genitalia of postoperative trans women found they had arousal patterns which were category specific (i.e. androphilic trans women were aroused by males, gynephilic trans women were aroused by females) in a similar fashion to natal males, and argue that vaginal photoplethysmographies are a useful technology for measuring the validity of such reports. The one trans woman in the study who reported a change in sexual orientation had arousal responses consistent with her pre-reassignment sexual orientation.

While undergoing hormone therapy, some trans men report experiencing increased sexual attraction to cisgender men. This change can be confusing for those who experience it because it is often not a change that they expect to happen.

However, gender transition does not always mean sexual orientation changes will happen. A 2021 study of 469 transgender women and 433 transgender men found that sexual orientation didn't change over time or with hormonal transition.

Transvestic fetishism 
The DSM once had a diagnosis of "transvestic fetishism". Some therapists and activists sought to de-pathologize this category in future revisions. DSM 5, which was released in 2013, replaced the transvestic fetishism category with "transvestic disorder".

Following the example of the Benjamin Scale, in 1979 Buhrich and McConaghy proposed three clinically discrete categories of fetishistic transvestism: "nuclear" transvestites who were satisfied with cross-dressing, "marginal" transvestites who also desired feminization by hormones or surgical intervention, and "fetishistic transsexuals", who had shown fetishistic arousal but who identified as transsexuals and sought sex reassignment surgery.

Sex work
In many cultures, transgender people (especially trans women) are frequently involved in sex work such as transgender pornography. This is correlated with employment discrimination. In the National Trans Discrimination Survey, 11% of respondents reported having done sex work for income, compared to 1% of cisgender women in the US. According to the same survey, 13% of transgender Americans are unemployed, almost double the national average. 26% had lost their jobs due to their gender identity/expression. Transgender sex workers have high rates of HIV. In a review of studies on HIV prevalence in trans women working in the sex industry, over 27% were HIV positive. However, the review found that trans women engaged in sex work were not more likely than trans women not engaged in sex work to be HIV positive. 
Studies have found that in the United States HIV is especially prevalent amongst transgender sex workers of color, particularly black trans women, a problem that has been identified by academics  and members of the transgender community.

The subject of transgender sex workers has attracted attention in the media. Paris Lees, a British trans woman and journalist, wrote an article in June 2012 for the Independent defending criticism of Ria, star of Channel 4 documentary Ria: Teen Transsexual, who was seventeen at the time and depicted as working as a prostitute  at a massage parlor, saying that the choice to engage in sex work is a matter of bodily autonomy and pointing out reasons that young trans women often turn to sex work such as low self-esteem and severe employment discrimination. 
A review by GLAAD of its archives of transgender-inclusive television episodes from 2002 to 2012 found that 20% of transgender characters were depicted as sex workers. A 2020 Netflix documentary, Disclosure, explores this in more depth.

History

Classifying transgender people by sexual orientation
Historically, transgender people were unable to access gender affirming care unless they would be considered heterosexual post surgery. For much of the early 1900s, transgender persons were conflated with being either an invert or homosexual; as such, non-heterosexual sexual orientation data for transgender people is limited. In the 1980s, Lou Sullivan was instrumental in allowing non-heterosexual transgender people access to surgical care and hormones.

Sexologist Magnus Hirschfeld first suggested a distinction based on sexual orientation in 1923. A number of two-type taxonomies based on sexuality have subsequently been proposed by clinicians, though some clinicians believe that other factors are more clinically useful categories, or that two types are insufficient.  Some researchers have distinguished trans men attracted to women and trans men attracted to men.

The Benjamin Scale proposed by endocrinologist Harry Benjamin in 1966 used sexual orientation as one of several factors to distinguish between "transvestites", "non-surgical" transsexuals, and "true transsexuals".

In 1974, Person and Ovesey proposed dividing transsexual women into "primary" and "secondary" transsexuals. They defined "primary transsexuals" as asexual persons with little or no interest in partnered sexual activity and with no history of sexual arousal to cross-dressing or "cross-gender fantasy". They defined both homosexual and "transvestic" trans people to be "secondary transsexuals".

Dr Norman Fisk noted those entering his clinic seeking reassignment surgery comprised a larger group than fit into the classical transsexual diagnosis. The article notes that effeminate gay men and heterosexual fetishistic transvestites desire surgery and could be considered good candidates for it.

In the DSM-II, released in 1968, "transsexualism" was within the "paraphilias" category, and no other information was provided.

In the DSM-III-R, released in 1987, the category of "gender identity disorder" was created, and "transsexualism" was divided into "asexual", "homosexual", "heterosexual" and "unspecified" sub-types.

In the DSM-IV-TR, released in 2000, "transsexualism" was renamed "gender identity disorder". Attraction specifications were to male, female, both, or neither, with specific variations dependent on birth sex.

In the DSM-V, released in 2013 and currently used in the United States and Canada, "gender identity disorder" is now "gender dysphoria", and attraction specifications are either gynephillic or androphillic.

See also

 Attraction to transgender people
 Blanchard's transsexualism typology
 Queer heterosexuality

References

 
Human sexuality